Mikhail Isaakovich Sheftel (1862–1919) was a Russian Jewish lawyer, member of the First Duma of the Russian Empire in 1906. He figured among the leaders of the OPE, the Society for the Promotion of Enlightenment among the Jews of Russia.

Sources

1862 births
1919 deaths
Politicians from Zhytomyr
People from Zhitomirsky Uyezd
Ukrainian Jews
Jews from the Russian Empire
Russian Constitutional Democratic Party members
Members of the 1st State Duma of the Russian Empire
Jewish activists
Saint Petersburg State University alumni